Basic Law Enforcement Training is a curriculum required by the state of North Carolina for certified law enforcement officers in the state.  It includes over 600 hours of instruction, exams and skills testing.  Students passing the class are eligible for certification.

References
 Davidson College - BLET page
 page Martin Community College - BLET
 Isothermal Community College - BLET info

Law enforcement in the United States